Girolamo Riminaldi was an Italian painter of the Baroque period. He was the brother of Orazio and practised in Pisa in the early part of the 17th century. He survived his brother, who died in 1631, and completed his Orazio's last work.

References

People from Pisa
17th-century Italian painters
Italian male painters
Painters from Tuscany
Italian Baroque painters
Year of death unknown
Year of birth unknown